is a Japanese actor.

Biography
When he was three years old, Imai was taken to a theater company since he said that he "[wanted] to be on television", and began his career.  He was called  after singing the Marimokkori theme song with a CoriCori member.  Imai was a member of Central Group Central Kodomo Talent until the end of 2009.

Since 2010, he has been a member of Production Ogi.

Filmography

TV series

Films

Anime

References

External links
 Official profile at ogipro.com 

21st-century Japanese male actors
Japanese male child actors
1998 births
Living people
Actors from Saitama Prefecture